David Isaac is a British solicitor and provost of Worcester College, Oxford.

David Isaac may also refer to:

 David Isaac (musician), guitarist and producer of Marcus Miller albums, such as Marcus
 David Isaac, Michigan candidate of United States House of Representatives elections, 1980
 David Isaac, co-songwriter of "Way to Go!"
 David Isaac, creator of British television series, Lunch Monkeys

See also 
 David Isaacs (disambiguation)